Ab Anjir-e Sofla (also Romaninized as Āb Anjīr-e Soflá; also known as Āb Anjīr-e Pā’īn) is a village in Lishtar Rural District, in the Central District of Gachsaran County, Kohgiluyeh and Boyer-Ahmad Province, Iran. At the 2006 census, its population was 98, in 23 families.

References 

Populated places in Gachsaran County